Michael Haydn's Symphony No. 30 in D major, Perger 21, Sherman 30, MH 399, was written in Salzburg in 1785.

Scored for 2 oboes, 2 bassoons, 2 horns and strings, in three movements:

Adagio - Allegro spiritoso
Andante sostenuto, in G major
Vivace molto

This symphony is the last of four by Michael Haydn to include a slow introduction before the first movement (the others are Symphonies Nos. 21, 22, and 27). All four were written between 1778 and 1785 and attached to symphonies cast in three movements (without minuets).

Discography

On the CPO label, this symphony is available on a CD that also includes Symphonies Nos. 21, 31 and 32. There is also an Olympia remastering to CD from an LP recording of Ervin Acél conducting the Oradea Philharmonic; that one also includes Symphonies Nos. 18 and 29 (the latter with Miron Raţiu instead of Acél).

References
 A. Delarte, "A Quick Overview Of The Instrumental Music Of Michael Haydn" Bob's Poetry Magazine November 2006: 26 PDF
 Charles H. Sherman and T. Donley Thomas, Johann Michael Haydn (1737 - 1806), a chronological thematic catalogue of his works. Stuyvesant, New York: Pendragon Press (1993)
 C. Sherman, "Johann Michael Haydn" in The Symphony: Salzburg, Part 2 London: Garland Publishing (1982): lxviii

Symphony 30
1785 compositions
Compositions in D major